Saydābād is a city in Maidan Wardak Province, central Afghanistan. It is the administrative center of Saydabad District, and located along the main Kabul-Kandahar Highway.

The city of Saydabad has a population of 7,301. It is located within the heartland of the Wardak tribe of Pashtuns.

Geography
Saydabad is located about 2,155 m above sea level.

Climate
Saydabad has a warm-summer humid continental climate (Köppen climate classification: Dsb)

Demographics
A majority of the population are Pashtuns. Pashto of the Wardagi accent is spoken in the town.

References

Populated places in Maidan Wardak Province